The Scottish Rally Championship is a rallying series run throughout Scotland over the course of a year, that comprises seven gravel rallies and one tarmac event. Points are awarded to the top placed drivers and the driver scoring the highest number of points over the season is declared Champion

David Bogie begins the year as defending champion after winning five out of the eight events in 2012.

For season 2013, the championship will be sponsored by ARR Craib Transport Ltd, an Aberdeen based road haulage and logistics company. This is a one-year deal announced in December 2012.

The 2013 season begins in the snow-covered forest tracks around Inverness on 16 February, with the season finale taking place around Perth on 5 October.

Following the Colin McRae Forest Stages Rally in October, David Bogie and his regular co-driver Kevin Rae were declared 2013 Scottish rally champions. This represents a record breaking fifth title in a row for the pair. The award ceremony took place on 30 November 2013 at the Marriott Hotel in Glasgow.

Thistle Snowman Rally
The opening event of the season, the Thistle Snowman Rally was abandoned due to an accident involving a competing car, which left the road and killed a 50-year-old spectator.

On 12 March 2013, series organisers announced that the Galloway Hills Rally – a reserve event when the championship calendar was first announced – would be included as the championship finale.

2013 Calendar
For season 2013 there are to be 8 events held on a variety of surfaces.

2013 results

* Not registered for SRC points.

Drivers' championship standings (Top 10)

Points are awarded to the highest placed registered driver on each event as follows: 30, 28, 27, 26, and so on down to 1 point.
At the end of the Championship, competitors will nominate their best 6 scores out of the 8 events as their final overall Championship score.

References

External links
 
 RSAC Scottish Rally Homepage

Scottish Rally Championship seasons
Scottish Rally Championship
Scottish Rally Championship